Tazeen is a female given name. Notable people with the name include:

 Tazeen Ahmad, reporter for American and British television news 
 Tazeen Fatma (born 1949), Indian politician
 Tazeen Qayyum (born 1973), Pakistani-Canadian conceptual artist

Feminine given names